Adan Dam, is an earthfill and rockfill dam on Aran river near Karanja, Washim district in state of Maharashtra in India.

Specifications

Purpose
 Irrigation

See also
 Dams in Maharashtra
 List of reservoirs and dams in India

References

Dams in Washim district
1977 establishments in Maharashtra
Dams completed in 1977